"Don't Hate the Player" is the sixth episode in the third season of the science fiction television series Warehouse 13. It originally aired on SyFy in the United States on August 15, 2011.

Plot

Claudia and Pete are preparing for a night of inventory. Pete tells Claudia that she should play her guitar at the venue sometime when her phone rings. The call is from a frantic man who tells her Douglas Fargo relayed her number if anything went wrong with the beta test. Claudia, Pete, and Myka rush to Palo Alto, California, to find Fargo and another man, Jerry, plugged into a machine. Gibson, the person, called Claudia, explains that it is a virtual game that malfunctioned; they are now stuck in the game. The men used Beatrix Potter's tea set (an artifact) to make the game work properly.

Claudia and Pete enter the game as characters, an elf, and a gladiator, respectively, to rescue the two players. They discover the game is a medieval version of Warehouse 13, complete with a rhyming Artie who sends them on a quest to save a princess and a Leena character. They rescue Fargo from quicksand to meet an ax-wielding monster who traps them in the game by taking their controllers. Deciding the only way to escape the game is to finish it, they set out to rescue the princess. However, the game does not end when they save the princess, a ditzy version of Claudia. As they discover at this point, Jerry is whisked off by the monster.

Back in reality, Myka discovers that Beatrix Potter's tea set takes their fears and makes them real in the game. The monster is Jerry's ex-girlfriend, Hannah, to whom he was afraid to propose. Claudia's fear finds her in a mental institution where a doctor tells her she imagined the Warehouse and everyone in it. Ultimately, Myka and Claudia realize the players can only destroy their fears. Claudia turns an electroshock device on her doctor, and they track down Hannah and send her in so Jerry can propose to the monster, ending the game.

In the 'B' plot, Artie and Steve Jinks investigate a mysterious suicide at the request of FBI agent Sally Stukowski. A new painting in the gallery is a lost Van Gogh, which Artie thinks is an artifact because "death follows it." Later that night, Jinks and Artie break into the gallery to find Stukowski waiting for them. They replace the Van Gogh with one they have copied, then discover the painting is activated by a puff of air after Stukowski sneezes on it, and she and Jinks are thrown across the room by a violent wind. The device used to disable the alarm fails, sounding the alarm. Stukowski escapes with the original Van Gogh before the doors shut, leaving Artie and Jinks arrested by the police.

After their arrest, Stukowski realizes Artie and Jinks are from the police and returns the painting. Once Artie and Jinks leave, Stukowski receives a nod of acknowledgment from a mysterious stranger (Sasha Roiz) and is later seen reporting to an unseen man in a wheelchair. Back at the Warehouse, small fly-like robots emerge from the painting and fly off without explanation. The episode ends with Claudia playing the club's guitar, as a slow-motion montage of the cast plays on the screen.

Crossovers from Eureka
Warehouse 13 is part of Syfy's shared fictional universe: Don't Hate the Player is one of three episodes with characters crossing over from Eureka. Douglas Fargo (played by Neil Grayston) is a main character in Eureka.

Artifacts
 Beatrix Potter's tea set – drinking the tea from the set stimulates the precuneus section of the brain, causing the drinker to live his worst fears.
 Vincent van Gogh's missing painting, A Stormy Night – when a gust of wind (such as Sally Stukowski sneezing) touches the canvas, the depicted storm comes to life and blows gale-force winds from the painting.
 Studio 54 Disco Ball (unused as an artifact) – used to chain "Leena of the Eagle People" to the ground. Not its primary function.
 "Memory Paper" from Johannes Gutenberg's printing press – Artie uses a sheet of this paper to create a replica of the Stormy Night painting. Per Artie, the paper's replication properties are so precise that "not even Van Gogh himself would know the difference."
 Steampunk Password Cracker – frequently used piece of Artie's travel bag; in this episode, Artie uses it to disable the security gate of the art gallery.
 Eclipse – disables security and alarm systems for forty-two minutes and fifty-nine seconds, the length of time in which a portion of the moon is darkened, rotating away from the sun. (It is also the length of Pink Floyd's The Dark Side of the Moon.)
 Nanotechnology insects – tiny robots which Sally Stukowski planted in the canvas of the Stormy Night painting before returning it to Artie and Steve. Once the painting is hung in the Warehouse, the insects break out of the image and infiltrate the Warehouse computer system.

Music
 "Where is My Mind?" covered by Allison Scagliotti
 Gerald Fried's 'Kirk's fight music' from the Star Trek episode "Amok Time"

Critical reaction
The episode received mostly positive reviews from critics and viewers. ScienceFiction.com praised it, summing up by saying, "It’s really no wonder at all why this is SyFy’s Golden Child scripted show!" Robwillreview.com went as far as to comment, that this episode was part of "a season that has been full of fantastic episodes...the most purely delightful installment of the series we’ve had". Io9 praised all of the many geek culture references in it and loved the video game idea. They described it as "enough nerd candy to give you geek diabetes. In a good way." The first-person shooter views were praised by most reviewers as "a brilliant move." One negative review came from IGN, which wrote, "It tries, and fails, to be a fun video game homage." Other negative aspects included the effect used inside the video game, which was called "distracting."

All reviewers agreed that Allison Scagliotti "practically steals the episode." From the ditsy princess to the screaming, terrified mental patient, her character performances were highly praised. Most labeled her as the episode's stand-out performer. Even the highly critical IGN reviewer admitted that her guitar performance was "actually quite respectable." Overall, most viewers commented that it was an excellent episode, with Scagliotti standing out.

References

External links

 

2011 American television episodes
Television episodes about virtual reality
Warehouse 13 episodes